The following is a filmography for the Indian film actor, singer, lyricist, composer, producer, director, screenwriter and scriptwriter Kishore Kumar (4 August 1929 – 13 October 1987):

As an actor
Kishore Kumar acted in 88 Hindi films.

As playback singer

Kishore Kumar sang in 1,198 films, a total number of 2678 Hindi songs including his released, unreleased and short songs.

1946 to 1960

1961 to 1970

1971 to 1980

1981 to 2013

As a producer

Kishore Kumar also produced 14 films, and wrote the story for these films. Six of these films were not completed. He is also credited with writing the screenplays of five films, two of which remained incomplete. He also directed 12 films, four of which were abandoned.

Kishore Kumar also composed music for all of his home productions:

Some of his notable songs as a composer include Koi Ham Dam Na Raha, Aa Chal Ke Tujhe, and Beqarar Dil Tu Gaye Ja. He also composed several Bengali songs, including Nayano Sarasi Keno, Priyatama Ki Likhi Tomay (sung by Lata Mangeshkar), and Sei Raate Raat Chilo Poornima.

Work with other singers and music directors

Kishore Kumar is also credited with the highest number of multi-singer and male duet hits with the finest singers of different eras. Some of the notable songs are as follows:

The following is the list of co-singers and the number of songs Kumar sang with each of them:

Below is a list of music directors with the total number of songs which they each composed in collaboration with Kumar.

	R D Burman	563
	Laxmikant-Pyarelal	401
	Bappi Lahiri	301
	Kalyanji-Aanandji	270
	Rajesh Roshan	152
	S D Burman	119
	Shankar Jaikishan	105
	Kishore Kumar	73
	Usha Khanna	60
	O.P.Nayyar	42
	Ravindra Jain	40
	Madan Mohan	36
	Anu Malik	35
	Chitragupta	35
	Ravi	30
	Salil Chaudhary	26
	Khayyam	25
	Sapan Jagmohan	23
	C Ramchandra	21
	Sonik Omi	21
	Hemant Kumar	18
	Ram-Laxman	16
	Hemant Bhosle	11
	Anil Biswas	10
	Sapan Chakraborty	10
	Shyamal Mitra	10
	Datta Naik	9
	Sharda	9
	Amar-Utpal	8
	Ganesh	8
	Jaidev	8
	Roshan	8
	Unknown	8
	Aanand-Milind	7
	Basu-Manohari	7
	Shiv-Hari	7
	Hridyanath Mangeshkar	6
	Khemchand Prakash	6
	Bhola Shreshta	5
	Nadeem-Shravan	5
	Babla Mehta	4
	Jugal Kishore	4
	Khemchand Prakash, Bhola Shreshtha, James Singh	4
	Mahesh naresh	4
	Mohinder Singh Sarna	4
	Vanraj Bhatia	4
	Vedpal	4
	Avinash Vyas	3
	Bipin Dutta	3
	Jimmy	3
	Lala Asar sattar	3
	Mandhir-Jatin	3
	Nitin Mangesh	3
	Uttam-Jagdish	3
	Vipin Reshamiya, Kishore Singh	3
	Ajit Singh	2
	Ali Akbar Khan	2
	Anil-Arun	2
	Babu Singh	2
	Chand Pardesi	2
	Chandru	2
	Deepan Chatterji	2
	Govind Naresh	2
	Husnlal Bhagatram	2
	Iqbal Qureshi	2
	Jai Kumar Partee	2
	Manoj-Gyan	2
	Pradeep Roy Chaudhary	2
	Prem Dhawan	2
	R Sudarshan, Dhaniram	2
	Sajjad	2
	Satyam	2
	Dakshina Tagore	1
	Ghulam Haider and Hansraj Behl	1
	Mohammed Shafi	1
	Ajit verman	1
	Alok Ganguly	1
	Anup Jalota	1
	Arun Kumar	1
	Arun Mukharjee	1
	Ashish Pandit-Pritam Chakraborty	1
	Asit Ganguly	1
	Aziz	1
	B D Burman	1
	Basant Prakash	1
	Bhupen Hazarika	1
	Bhushan mehta	1
	Bulo C Rani	1
	C.P.Bhatti	1
	Chic Chocolate	1
	Dattaram Wadekar	1
	Ghanshyam	1
	Hansraj behl	1
	Iqbal	1
	Jeetu Tapan	1
	K.Babuji	1
	M.Ashraf	1
	Manas Mukharjee	1
	Manna dey, S K Pal, Kheemchand Prakash	1
	Nachiket Ghosh	1
	Naushad	1
	Panna Lal Ghosh	1
	Raj Kamal	1
	Ramesh Gupta	1
	Ratandeep hemraj	1
	S K Pal	1
	Shamji-Ghanshyamji	1
	Shanti Kumar Desai	1
	Sudhir Phadke	1
	Ved Pal Sharma	1

Total 2678 songs he sang with 110 different music directors in Hindi only throughout his life time including himself also.

References

External links 
 
 yoodleeyoo.com

Indian filmographies